Tiphia femorata, often known as a beetle-killing wasp or common tiphiid wasp, is a species of wasp belonging to the family Tiphiidae, subfamily Tiphiinae.

Subspecies
Subspecies include:
 Tiphia femorata femorata  Fabricius, 1775 
 Tiphia femorata vaucheri  Tournier, 1901  (Belgium, Spain, North Africa)

Distribution and habitat
This species is present in most of Europe, the eastern Palearctic realm, and North Africa. It mainly inhabits warmer, dry and semi-arid grasslands and meadows.

Description
The body is completely black, light haired, and the tibiae and femora of the middle and rear pairs of legs are reddish brown. Rather similar species are Tiphia minuta and Tiphia unicolor.

Biology
It is a univoltine species. These wasps can be encountered from June through September feeding on nectar and pollen of flowers (especially on Apiaceae species).

Like most members of Tiphiidae, T. femorata parasitizes by stinging the larvae of various species of Scarabaeidae, though especially hunts beetles of Amphimallon solstitiale. The females can smell larvae of beetles in the soil, then they dig up and drop an egg in their victims. The larvae of T. femorata feed externally on the grubs.

Gallery

Bibliography
Allen H. W., Jaynes H. A. (1930). Contribution to the taxonomy of Asiatic wasps of the genus Tiphia (Scoliidae). // Proc. U. S. Nat. Museum, 1930. Vol. 76, N 17. 105 p.
Tsuneki К. (1985). Taxonomic studies of the Japanese species of the genus Tiphia (I). Revision and addition (Hymenoptera, Tiphiidae). // Spec. Publ. Jap. Hymen. Assoc. 1985. N 31. P. 1-90.

References

External links
 Insectconsultancy

Tiphiidae
Insects described in 1775
Hymenoptera of Europe
Taxa named by Johan Christian Fabricius